Bedo may refer to:

People
Bedo Aeddren, Welsh poet
Bedo Brwynllys, Welsh poet
Bedo Hafesp, Welsh poet
Bedo Phylip Bach, Welsh poet

Places
Bedo, village in Haiti
Bedő, village in Hungary

See also
Beddoe
Beddoes
Nicolas Bedos, French actor and comedian